The 2023 Big Ten conference football season is the 128th season of college football play for the Big Ten Conference and part of the 2023 NCAA Division I FBS football season. This is the Big Ten's tenth season with 14 teams. Next season the league will expand to 16 with the additions of UCLA and USC.

Previous season
Michigan won the East Division championship, with the Wolverines making their second consecutive appearance in the Big Ten Championship Game. In the West Division, Purdue won the division title and made their first championship game appearance. In that championship game, Michigan defeated Purdue 43–22 to win the Big Ten championship. With that win, the Wolverines landed a spot in the 2022–23 College Football Playoff as the No. 2 seed. The Wolverines lost in the semifinal game of the playoffs to third-seeded TCU 51–45 in the Fiesta Bowl (national semifinal). Along with Michigan, the Big Ten placed a second team into the College Football Playoff as Ohio State earned the #4 seed, but fell to the top-seed and eventual national champion Georgia in the Peach Bowl, 42–41.

Besides Michigan and Ohio State, seven other Big Ten football teams qualified for bowl games: Illinois, Iowa, Maryland, Minnesota, Penn State, Purdue, and Wisconsin. The Big Ten overall went 5–4 in postseason games in the 2022 season.

Coaching changes 
There are three head coaching changes in the Big Ten for the 2023 season. Nebraska hired Matt Rhule to replace Scott Frost. Rhule most recently coached in the NFL with the Carolina Panthers.

Purdue hired Illinois defensive coordinator Ryan Walters to replace Jeff Brohm, who left for the head coaching job at his alma mater of Louisville.

Finally, Wisconsin released Paul Chryst and replaced him with Luke Fickell, who had been serving as the head coach at Cincinnati.

Preseason

Recruiting classes

Big Ten Media Days

Preseason Media Poll

Preseason awards

All−American Teams

Rankings

Schedule

All times Eastern time.

† denotes Homecoming game

Regular season schedule

Week 1

Week 2

Week 3

Week 4

Week 5

Week 6

Week 7

Week 8

Week 9

Week 10

Week 11

Week 12

Week 13

Big Ten Championship Game

Postseason

Bowl games

Big Ten records vs other conferences

2023–2024 records against non-conference foes

Post Season

Awards and honors

Player of the week honors

Big Ten Individual Awards

All-Conference Teams

Home attendance

Bold – Exceed capacity
†Season High

2024 NFL Draft

The following list includes all Big Ten players who were drafted in the 2024 NFL Draft

Head coaches

References